Xianshenlou is a pavilion-style building located in Jiexiu, Shanxi, China, first built in the Song dynasty as the stage that formed part of larger Zoroastrian temple complex. 

While the temple itself has since been demolished and replaced by a Taoist monastery, Xianshenlou is considered to be the sole surviving Zoroastrian building in China, and as such was listed as a Major Historical and Cultural Site Protected at the National Level in 1996.

Gallery

See also 
 Sogdian Daēnās
 Zoroastrianism in China

References 

Major National Historical and Cultural Sites in Shanxi
All articles with unsourced statements
Articles using infobox templates with no data rows
Jinzhong